Magdalena Stoilkovska (born 12 April 1996) is a Мacedonian tennis player.

She has career-high WTA rankings of 1046 in singles, achieved on 19 March 2018, and 925 in doubles, set on 21 September 2015.

Stoilkovska represents North Macedonia in the Fed Cup.

References

External links
 
 
 
 

1996 births
Living people
Macedonian female tennis players